A Navy shower (also known as a "combat shower", "military shower", "sea shower", "staggered shower", or "G.I. bath") is a method of showering that allows for significant conservation of water and energy by turning off the flow of water in the middle portion of the shower while lathering. The total running time of this kind of shower can last less than two minutes – using an initial thirty seconds or so to get wet, followed by shutting off the water, using soap and shampoo and lathering, then rinsing for a minute or less.

Navy showers originated on naval ships, where supplies of fresh water were often scarce.  Using this method, crew members were able to stay clean, while conserving their limited water supply. The concept has also been adopted by some other people who wish to conserve water and the energy needed to heat the water, for both environmental and economic reasons.  According to the U.S. Department of Energy, water heating is typically the second-largest energy expense in homes (after space heating).

Maritime cruisers often take navy showers when they are not in a port with easy access to fresh water.

In United States Navy parlance, the term "Hollywood shower" contrasts with a Navy shower, referring to a long shower with very high water usage.

See also
 Saltwater soap, also called sailors' soap

References

Bathing
Navies
Water conservation